This is a list of 31 species in the genus Phyllocycla.

Phyllocycla species

 Phyllocycla anduzei (Needham, 1943)
 Phyllocycla argentina (Hagen in Selys, 1878)
 Phyllocycla armata Belle, 1977
 Phyllocycla baria Belle, 1987
 Phyllocycla bartica Calvert, 1948
 Phyllocycla basidenta Dunkle, 1987
 Phyllocycla brasilia Belle, 1988
 Phyllocycla breviphylla Belle, 1975  (ringed forceptail)
 Phyllocycla diphylla (Selys, 1854)
 Phyllocycla elongata (Selys, 1858)
 Phyllocycla foliata Belle, 1988
 Phyllocycla gladiata (Hagen in Selys, 1854)
 Phyllocycla hamata Belle, 1990
 Phyllocycla hespera (Calvert, 1909)
 Phyllocycla malkini Belle, 1970
 Phyllocycla medusa Belle, 1988
 Phyllocycla modesta Belle, 1970
 Phyllocycla murrea Belle, 1988
 Phyllocycla neotropica Belle, 1970
 Phyllocycla ophis (Selys, 1869)
 Phyllocycla pallida Belle, 1970
 Phyllocycla pegasus (Selys, 1869)
 Phyllocycla propinqua Belle, 1972
 Phyllocycla signata (Hagen in Selys, 1854)
 Phyllocycla sordida (Selys, 1854)
 Phyllocycla speculatrix Belle, 1975
 Phyllocycla titschacki (Schmidt, 1942)
 Phyllocycla uniforma Dunkle, 1987
 Phyllocycla vesta Belle, 1972
 Phyllocycla viridipleuris (Calvert, 1909)
 Phyllocycla volsella (Calvert, 1905)

References